Undisputed championship may refer to:

Undisputed championship (boxing)
Undisputed championship (professional wrestling)